Nosara Airport  is an airport serving Nosara, a village in the Guanacaste Province of Costa Rica. The airport is approximately 15 minutes from the beaches of Nosara, the main tourist attraction in the area. The airport is owned and administrated by the country's Directorate General of Civil Aviation (DGAC).

Nosara Airport receives only domestic flights, but has daily scheduled service from the Costa Rican capital, San José.

The runway length includes a  displaced threshold on Runway 04. There is nearby low mountainous terrain north of the airport, and also east through south.

Airlines and destinations

Passenger Statistics
These data show number of passengers movements into the airport, according to the DGAC Statistical Yearbooks.

See also
Transport in Costa Rica
List of airports in Costa Rica

References

External links
OurAirports - Nosara

Airports in Costa Rica
Buildings and structures in Guanacaste Province